James Honeyben is a rugby union coach and former English professional rugby player, playing principally at scrum half.

He was a member of the Wasps Academy since 2002, then worked his way up within Wasps and was named as part of the senior squad starting in the 09/10 season. He was a familiar part of that squad despite injuries, including one to his groin in 2004/05. In that season he earned an U19 cap for England.

He played 5 times for Wasps in the Premiership. In the 2005/06 season, Honeyben made his Premiership debut against Sale in February as well as starting 13 out of 16 matches for the A team. Making his second start for the senior side, Honeyben ran out against Worcester in March, and gained a place on the pitch in the final game of the season against Gloucester.

The following season saw Honeyben as a member of the winning A League side with 10 appearances, but a shoulder injury held him back for a large part of the season. He recovered just in time for the start of the 07/08 season and was a part of the Middlesex 7s side. Unfortunately injury forced Honeyben off the pitch and he underwent surgery on his knee ligaments, but soon returned to training.

Honeyben had a successful 2008/9 season with the A side, although they couldn't claim the A League title for a third season. He then played for Exeter Chiefs.

He retired from playing to become a full-time coach with Wasps Academy.

 he is head of rugby at RGS High Wycombe.

References

External links

1986 births
Exeter Chiefs players
Living people
People educated at the Royal Grammar School, High Wycombe
Wasps RFC players